Poca is a town in Putnam County, West Virginia, United States. The population was 875 at the 2020 census. Poca is a part of the Huntington-Ashland, WV-KY-OH, Metropolitan Statistical Area (MSA). As of the 2010 census, the MSA had a population of 287,702. New definitions from February 28, 2013 placed the population at 363,000.

The town derives its name from the Pocatalico River.

Geography
Poca is located at  (38.461343, -81.815592). It is sited at the confluence of the Kanawha River and the Pocatalico River.

Demographics

2010 census
As of the census of 2010, there were 974 people, 395 households, and 290 families living in the town. The racial makeup of the town was 98.7% White, 0.5% African American, 0.2% Asian, and 0.6% from two or more races. Hispanic or Latino of any race were 0.6% of the population.

There were 395 households, of which 28.9% had children under the age of 18 living with them, 58.2% were married couples living together, 10.1% had a female householder with no husband present, 5.1% had a male householder with no wife present, and 26.6% were non-families. 24.1% of all households were made up of individuals, and 11.2% had someone living alone who was 65 years of age or older. The average household size was 2.45 and the average family size was 2.86.

The median age in the town was 42.9 years. 21.6% of residents were under the age of 18; 7.2% were between the ages of 18 and 24; 24.3% were from 25 to 44; 28% were from 45 to 64; and 18.9% were 65 years of age or older. The gender makeup of the town was 48.5% male and 51.5% female.

2000 census
As of the census of 2000, there were 1,013 people, 404 households, and 311 families living in the town. The population density was 1,806.2 inhabitants per square mile (698.4/km2). There were 430 housing units at an average density of 766.7 per square mile (296.5/km2). The racial makeup of the town was 97.24% White, 1.09% African American, 0.49% Native American, and 1.18% from two or more races. Hispanic or Latino of any race were 0.49% of the population.

There were 404 households, out of which 34.4% had children that were under the age of 18 living with them, 61.9% were married couples living together, 11.6% had a female householder with no husband present, and 23.0% were non-families. 21.3% of all households were made up of individuals, and 7.2% had someone living alone who was 65 years of age or older. The average household size was 2.51 and the average family size was 2.86.

In the town, the population was spread out, with 23.5% under the age of 18, 8.6% from 18 to 24, 27.2% from 25 to 44, 27.2% from 45 to 64, and 13.4% who were 65 years of age or older. The median age was 38 years. For every 100 females, there were 93.3 males. For every 100 females age 18 and over, there were 89.0 males.

The median income for a household in the town was $42,273, and the median income for a family was $49,500. Males had a median income of $39,306 versus $20,536 for females. The per capita income for the town was $19,108. About 9.2% of families and 12.0% of the population were below the poverty line, including 19.1% of those under age 18 and 2.5% of those age 65 or over.

Culture
The town's high school is somewhat famous for having the mascot "Dots,"  Poca Dots. Poca High School recently was selected by ESPN as having the number one sports nickname in the country.

Poca High School's show choir, "Visual Volume," is a 14-time WVMEA state show choir champion. Director Joseph Kincaid, renowned for his title as "Best Dressed Director" in WVMEA competitive show choir, is a National Board certified teacher. As of 2018, Leonard Varner was the director. In Spring of 2020, Leonard Varner went missing after allegations. The new show choir director is Michael Rose as of Fall 2020.

Poca is also memorialized in a series of art stamps and related stories created by West Virginian artist Ben Mahmoud.  The series of stamps feature humorous fictional stories sensationalized around bits and pieces of actual history.

References

Towns in Putnam County, West Virginia
Populated places on the Kanawha River